Kalidas Nag (16 January 1892 – 9 November 1966) was an Indian historian, writer and parliamentarian. He was nominated to the Rajya Sabha in 1952 and served till 1954.

Early years
Kalidas was born to Babu Matilal Nag. He married Shrimati Santa Devi, daughter of Ramananda Chatterjee. Together they had three daughters.

Education and career

After graduating in history from the Scottish Church College, he earned a postgraduate degree from the University of Calcutta, and a doctorate from the University of Paris. A prolific author, he taught history at the Scottish Church College and at University of Calcutta, and was nominated as an Officer d’ Academic by the Government of France.
In the 1920s he was an avid supporter of the French contribution to Tagore's university project at Santiniketan (north of Calcutta). He later edited several books on India culture.

Bibliography
Kalidas Nag (1957). Discovery of Asia, The Institute of Asian African Relations, Calcutta.

References

Sources
Brief biodata at Rajya Sabha

Nominated members of the Rajya Sabha
1892 births
1966 deaths
Scottish Church College alumni
University of Calcutta alumni
Academic staff of Scottish Church College
Academic staff of the University of Calcutta
20th-century Indian historians
University of Paris alumni
Expatriates from British India in France
Bengali historians

Writers from West Bengal